Kallidaikurichi Aiyah Nilakanta Sastri (12 August 1892 – 15 June 1975) was an Indian historian who wrote on South Indian history. Many of his books form the standard reference works on the subject. Sastri was acclaimed for his scholarship and mastery of sources and was a recipient of the third highest Indian civilian honour of Padma Bhushan.

Career 

Nilakanta Sastri was born in a Telugu Niyogi Brahmin family, in Kallidaikurichi near Tirunelveli, on 12 August 1892. He completed his FA in M.D.T Hindu College, Tirunelveli and his college education in Madras Christian College.

Sastri obtained his MA by coming first in the Madras Presidency. He joined the Hindoo College as lecturer in 1913 where he taught till 1918. He served as Professor of History, Banaras Hindu University from 1918 to 1920. After that he became the Principal of the (then) newly started Arts College of Annamalai University.
In 1929, he was employed as Professor of History at National College, Trichy. The same year, he succeeded Sakkottai Krishnaswamy Aiyangar as the Professor of History and Archaeology at the Madras University, a post he held till 1946. He was the Professor of Indology (Currently renamed as Department of History and Archaeology) at the University of Mysore from 1952 to 1955. He was appointed as the ex-officio Director of Archaeology for the Mysore State in 1954. He was also the President of the All-India Oriental Conference in the early 1950s. From 1957 to 1972, he served with the UNESCO's Institute of Traditional Cultures of South East Asia, as the Director of the institute. In 1957, he was awarded the Padma Bhushan, India's third highest civilian honour. In the summer of 1959, he was a visiting professor at the University of Chicago where he delivered a series of lectures on South Indian History. Nilakanta Sastri died in 1975.

Assessment 

Nilakanta Sastri is regarded as the greatest and most prolific among professional historians of South India.  Tamil historian A R Venkatachalapathy regards him as "arguably the most distinguished historian of twentieth-century Tamil Nadu".

In 1915, a Bengali historian Jadunath Sarkar, wrote an essay Confessions of a History Teacher in the Modern Review regretting the lack of acclaimed historical works in vernacular languages and stressed that efforts should be made to write history books and teach history in vernacular languages. Nilakanta Sastri, who was then a young teacher in Thirunelveli, wrote a letter to the newspaper opposing Sarkar's suggestion by saying that "English serves me better as a medium of expression than Tamil – I mean in handling historical subjects. Perhaps the vernacular is not so well off in this part of the country as it should be". Sastri's comments evoked sharp criticism from the nationalist poet Subramanya Bharathi. According to Venkatachalapathy, Sastri's Tamil proficiency was not good and he relied on Tamil scholar S. Vaiyapuri Pillai for understanding Tamil literary works. Thus he was not able to analyse the changing meaning of words over time. Venkatachalapathy says, "In the professional historiography in Tamil Nadu practised in the age of K. A. Nilakanta Sastri there was rarely any interrogation of sources (except in terms of authenticity and chronology)."

Sastri's A History of South India is a recommended textbook for university students of Indian history. In a preface to the 2013 reprint, historian Sanjay Subrahmanyam describes the book thus

Historian Noboru Karashima, who edited A Concise History of South India (2014), describes Sastri's A History of South India as an excellent book, and praises Sastri's examination of sources of south Indian history as "thoroughgoing and meticulous". However, Karashima also states that being a Brahmin, Sastri was inclined to emphasize the role of "north Indian and Sanskrit culture in the development of south Indian society", which resulted in occasional bias. Karashima notes that Sastri's book remained the only authoritative scholarly book on the south Indian history for a number of reasons: nobody could match Sastri in bringing out a similar work; attacks from Tamil nationalists deterred historians from writing such a book; and new trends in history writing made composition of works on general history more difficult.

Ganapathy Subbiah (2007) of the Indian History Congress describes Sastri as "the greatest" of all South Indian historians. During Sastri's period, strong language-based movements had emerged in various regions of South India. Subbiah notes that Sastri attempted to portray South India as a distinct geocultural unit, and was keen to dissolve the growth of regionalism in South Indian historiography. Subbiah adds that Sastri's macro-level view of the South Indian history "revolved around Aryan-Dravidian syndrome", and this view changed with his age: in his 20s, Sastri asserted the existence of "an independent Tamil culture which flourished for centuries before it was touched by extraneous influences"; a few years later, he wrote that the culture of the Sangam period was a composite of two distinct "Tamilian and Aryan" cultures; and a decade later, he declared that "Sanskrit is the pivot of our whole culture, and [...] Tamil culture is no exception to this rule". According to Subbiah, Sastri's views should be analyzed in the context of the rise of the anti-Brahmin Dravida Nadu movement in the mid-20th century: his assertions over-emphasizing the importance of Indo-Aryan and Sanskrit influence in south Indian history can be seen as "his angry and desperate response" against the Dravida Nadu secessionists.

Bibliography 

In all, Nilakanta Sastri authored 25 historical works mostly on the history of South India.

Notes

Bibliography

Further reading 

 

Tamil historians
1892 births
1975 deaths
Indian Indologists
Dravidologists
Madras Christian College alumni
Recipients of the Padma Bhushan in literature & education
Academic staff of the University of Mysore
People from Tirunelveli district
Academic staff of Annamalai University
Academic staff of the University of Madras
University of Madras alumni
20th-century Indian historians
Historians of South Asia
Scholars from Tamil Nadu
Telugu people
Historians of Kerala